East West Media Group is a media conglomerate located in Bashundhara Residential Area, Dhaka, Bangladesh. It is a subsidiary of Bashundhara Group. Mostafa Kamal Mohiuddin is the chairman of the Media Group. Novelist and former editor of Kaler Kantho Imdadul Haq Milan is the brand ambassador of the Media Group.  Naem Nizam is Director of the group.

History
The company was established in 2009. In 2016 the company was awarded by the National Board of Revenue for being a high tax payer.

Subsidiaries
 Daily Sun
 Bangladesh Pratidin A Bangla Language newspaper and the largest circulated Newspaper in Bangladesh.
 Kaler Kantho
 Banglanews24.com – Online news portal.
 News24 – HD satellite news channel.
 T Sports- Sports channel.
 Radio Capital An FM radio Station based in Dhaka.

References

Mass media companies of Bangladesh
Companies based in Dhaka
Bangladeshi companies established in 2009
Mass media companies established in 2009